Gymnoceros is a moth genus of the family Depressariidae.

Species
 Gymnoceros nipholeuca (Turner, 1946)
 Gymnoceros pallidula Turner, 1946

References

Depressariinae